Julian Knowle and Philipp Petzschner were the defending champions, but Knowle chose not to participate this year. Petzschner played alongside Jürgen Melzer, but lost in the semifinals to Julio Peralta and Horacio Zeballos.

Peralta and Zeballos went on to win the title, defeating Simone Bolelli and Fabio Fognini in the final, 6–3, 6–4.

Seeds

Draw

Draw

External links
 Main Draw

Swedish Open - Doubles
2018 Doubles